Laurence Leboucher (born 22 February 1972 in Alençon, Orne) is a French professional cross-country mountain bike and cyclo-cross racer. She is a three-time Olympian and two-time world cyclo-cross champion.

Major achievements 
Important results for Laurence Leboucher are:

1998
 1st (Gold Medal), World Mountain Bike Championships, Cross Country
 1st, European Cyclo-cross Championships
2000
 1st, European Cyclo-cross Championships
 3rd, Round 2, Tissot-UCI Mountain Bike World Cup
2001
 1st, European Cyclo-cross Championships
2002
 1st (Gold Medal), World Cyclo-cross Championships
2003
 3rd (Bronze Medal), World Cyclo-cross Championships
2004
 1st (Gold Medal), World Cyclo-cross Championships
2005
 2nd, French Cyclo-cross Championships

References

1972 births
Living people
Sportspeople from Alençon
French female cyclists
Cross-country mountain bikers
Cyclo-cross cyclists
Cyclists at the 1996 Summer Olympics
Cyclists at the 2000 Summer Olympics
Cyclists at the 2004 Summer Olympics
Cyclists at the 2008 Summer Olympics
Olympic cyclists of France
UCI Cyclo-cross World Champions (women)
UCI Mountain Bike World Champions (women)
Cyclists from Normandy